Nicole Jeanette Cannizzaro (born January 19, 1983) is an American Democratic politician currently serving in the Nevada Senate. She represents the 6th district, which covers parts of Las Vegas.

Biography
Cannizzaro was born in Las Vegas. She received a bachelor's degree in business administration and management from the University of Nevada, Reno in 2006, and a Juris Doctor from the William S. Boyd School of Law at the University of Nevada, Las Vegas in 2010. Following graduation, she worked as a legal clerk and then began practicing law in Las Vegas. After working in private practice, in 2011, she joined the Clark County District Attorney's Office. She is now a Chief Deputy District Attorney at the Clark County District Attorney's Office.

Cannizzaro was elected to the Senate in 2016 by a narrow margin, defeating Republican Victoria Seaman.

Personal life
Cannizzaro is married to her husband Nate.

Electoral history

References

External links
 Profile at the Nevada Senate
 Campaign website

1983 births
21st-century American lawyers
21st-century American politicians
21st-century American women politicians
21st-century American women lawyers
Living people
Nevada lawyers
Democratic Party Nevada state senators
Politicians from Las Vegas
University of Nevada, Reno alumni
William S. Boyd School of Law alumni
Women state legislators in Nevada